Apophthisis congregata is a moth of the family Gracillariidae. It is known from California, United States.

References

Gracillariinae